12 Angry Men is a 1957 American courtroom drama film directed by Sidney Lumet, adapted from a 1954 teleplay of the same name by Reginald Rose. The film tells the story of a jury of 12 men as they deliberate the conviction or acquittal of a teenager charged with murder on the basis of reasonable doubt; disagreement and conflict among them force the jurors to question their morals and values. It stars Henry Fonda (who also produced the film with Reginald Rose), Lee J. Cobb, Ed Begley, E. G. Marshall, and Jack Warden.

12 Angry Men explores many techniques of consensus-building and the difficulties encountered in the process among this group of men whose range of personalities adds to the intensity and conflict. The jury members are identified only by number; no names are revealed until an exchange of dialogue at the very end. The film forces the audience to evaluate their own self-image through observing the personalities, experiences, and actions of the jurors. The film is also notable for its almost exclusive use of one set, where all but three minutes of the film takes place.

The film was selected as the second-best courtroom drama ever (after 1962's To Kill a Mockingbird) by the American Film Institute for their AFI's 10 Top 10 list. It is regarded by many as one of the greatest films ever made. In 2007, the film was selected for preservation in the United States National Film Registry by the Library of Congress as being "culturally, historically, or aesthetically significant".

Plot 

In the sweltering jury room of the New York County Courthouse, a jury prepares to deliberate the case of an impoverished teenager accused of stabbing his abusive father to death. The judge instructs the Jury that if there is any reasonable doubt, the jurors are to return a verdict of not guilty; if found guilty, the defendant will receive a mandatory death sentence via the electric chair. The verdict must be unanimous.

At first, the case seems clear. A neighbor testified to witnessing the defendant stab his father from her window, through the windows of a passing elevated train. Another neighbor testified that he heard the defendant threaten to kill his father, and the father's body hitting the ground; then, as he ran to his door, saw the defendant running down the stairs. The boy has a violent past; he had recently purchased a switchblade of the same type that was found, wiped of fingerprints, at the murder scene, but claimed he lost it.

In a preliminary vote, all jurors vote "guilty" except Juror 8, who believes that there should be some discussion before the verdict is made. He says he cannot vote "guilty" because reasonable doubt exists. With his first few arguments seemingly failing to convince any of the other jurors, Juror 8 suggests a secret ballot, from which he will abstain; if all the other jurors still vote guilty, he will acquiesce. The ballot reveals one "not guilty" vote. Juror 9 reveals that he changed his vote; he respects Juror 8's motives, and agrees that there should be more discussion.
 
Juror 8 argues that the noise of the passing train would have obscured everything the second witness claimed to have overheard. Juror 5 changes his vote, followed by Juror 11. Jurors 5, 6, and 8 further question the second witness's story. After looking at a diagram of the witness's apartment and conducting an experiment, the jurors determine that it is impossible the disabled witness could have made it to the door in time. Juror 3, infuriated, argues with and tries to attack Juror 8. Jurors 2 and 6 change their votes; the jury is now evenly split.

Juror 4 doubts the defendant's alibi based on the boy's inability to recall specific details. Juror 8 tests Juror 4's own memory to make a point. Jurors 2 and 5 point out the unlikelihood the boy made a stab wound angled downwards, as he was shorter than his father. Juror 7 changes his vote out of impatience rather than conviction, angering Juror 11. After another vote, Jurors 12 and 1 also change sides, leaving only three "guilty" votes.

Juror 10 begins a bigoted rant, causing Juror 4 to forbid him to speak for the remainder of the deliberation. When Juror 4 is pressed as to why he still maintains a guilty vote, he declares that the woman who saw the killing from across the street stands as solid evidence. Juror 12 reverts to a guilty vote.

After watching Juror 4 remove his glasses and rub the impressions they made on his nose, Juror 9 realizes that the first witness was constantly rubbing similar impressions on her own nose, indicating that she also was a habitual glasses wearer. He observes she also always dressed up in clothes befitting a younger woman, hence not wearing the glasses in court. Juror 8 remarks that the witness, who was trying to sleep when she saw the killing through her bedroom window, would not have had glasses on or the time to put them on, making her story questionable. Jurors 12, 10 and 4 all change their vote, leaving Juror 3 as the sole dissenter.

Juror 3 loudly tries to convince the others, revealing that his strained relationship with his own son makes him wish the defendant guilty. He breaks down in tears and changes his vote to "not guilty". As the others leave, Juror 8 graciously helps Juror 3 with his coat. The defendant is acquitted off-screen, and the jurors leave the courthouse. Jurors 8 and 9 stop to learn each other's real names (Davis and McCardle, respectively), before parting.

Cast 

 Martin Balsam as Juror 1, the jury foreman; a calm and methodical assistant high school football coach.
 John Fiedler as Juror 2, a meek and unpretentious bank teller who is easily flustered, but eventually stands up for himself. 
 Lee J. Cobb as Juror 3, a hot-tempered owner of a courier business who is estranged from his son; the most passionate advocate of a "guilty" verdict.
 E. G. Marshall as Juror 4, an unflappable, conscientious, and analytical stock broker who is concerned only with facts, not opinions. 
 Jack Klugman as Juror 5, a Baltimore Orioles fan who grew up in a violent slum, and is sensitive to bigotry towards "slum kids". 
 Edward Binns as Juror 6, a tough but principled house painter who objects to others, especially the elderly, being verbally abused.
 Jack Warden as Juror 7, a wisecracking salesman who is more concerned about the Yankees game he is missing than the case.
 Henry Fonda as Davis, Juror 8, a humane, justice-seeking architect and father of three; initially, the only one to question the evidence and vote "not guilty". 
 Joseph Sweeney as McCardle, Juror 9, a thoughtful and intelligent elderly man who is highly observant of the witnesses' behaviors and their possible motivations.
 Ed Begley as Juror 10, a pushy, loud-mouthed, and xenophobic garage owner.
 George Voskovec as Juror 11, a polite European watchmaker and naturalized American citizen who demonstrates strong respect for democratic values such as due process.
 Robert Webber as Juror 12, an indecisive and easily distracted advertising executive.
 Rudy Bond as the Judge
 Tom Gorman as the Stenographer
 James Kelly as the Bailiff
 Billy Nelson as the Court clerk
 John Savoca as the Defendant
 Walter Stocker as Man waiting for elevator

Themes 
Professor of Law Emeritus at UCLA School of Law Michael Asimow referred to the film as a "tribute to a common man holding out against lynch mob mentality". Gavin Smith of Film Comment called the film "a definitive rebuttal to the lynch mob hysteria of the McCarthy era".

Business academic Phil Rosenzweig called the jury in 12 Angry Men being made up entirely of white men "especially important", writing: "Many of the twelve would have looked around the room, and, seeing other white men, assumed that they had much in common and should be able to reach a verdict without difficulty. As they deliberate, however, fault lines begin to appear—by age, by education, by national origin, by socioeconomic level, by values, and by temperament."

Production 
Reginald Rose's screenplay for 12 Angry Men was initially produced for television (starring Robert Cummings as Juror 8), and was broadcast live on the CBS program Studio One in September 1954. A complete kinescope of that performance, which had been missing for years and was feared lost, was discovered in 2003. It was staged at Chelsea Studios in New York City.

The success of the television production resulted in a film adaptation. Sidney Lumet, whose prior directorial credits included dramas for television productions such as The Alcoa Hour and Studio One, was recruited by Henry Fonda and Rose to direct. 12 Angry Men was Lumet's first feature film, and the only producing credit for Fonda and Rose (under the production company, Orion-Nova Productions). Fonda later stated that he would never again produce a film.

The film was shot in New York and completed after a short but rigorous rehearsal schedule, in less than three weeks, on a budget of $337,000. Rose and Fonda took salary deferrals.

At the beginning of the film, the cameras are positioned above eye level and mounted with wide-angle lenses, to give the appearance of greater depth between subjects, but as the film progresses the focal length of the lenses is gradually increased. By the end of the film, nearly everyone is shown in closeup, using telephoto lenses from a lower angle, which decreases or "shortens" depth of field. Lumet stated that his intention in using these techniques with cinematographer Boris Kaufman was to create a nearly palpable claustrophobia.

Reception

Initial response 
On its first release, 12 Angry Men received critical acclaim. A. H. Weiler of The New York Times wrote, "It makes for taut, absorbing, and compelling drama that reaches far beyond the close confines of its jury room setting." His observation of the twelve men was that "their dramas are powerful and provocative enough to keep a viewer spellbound." Variety called it an "absorbing drama" with acting that was "perhaps the best seen recently in any single film", Philip K. Scheuer of the Los Angeles Times declared it a "tour de force in movie making", The Monthly Film Bulletin deemed it "a compelling and outstandingly well handled drama", and John McCarten of The New Yorker called it "a fairly substantial addition to the celluloid landscape".

The film was a box office disappointment in the US but did better internationally. The advent of color and widescreen productions may have contributed to its disappointing box office performance. It was not until its first airing on television that the movie finally found its audience.

Legacy 
The film is viewed as a classic, highly regarded from both a critical and popular viewpoint: Roger Ebert listed it as one of his "Great Movies". The American Film Institute named Juror 8, played by Henry Fonda, 28th in a list of the 50 greatest movie heroes of the 20th century. AFI also named 12 Angry Men the 42nd-most inspiring film, the 88th-most heart-pounding film and the 87th-best film of the past hundred years. The film was also nominated for the 100 movies list in 1998. In 2011, the film was the second-most screened film in secondary schools in the United Kingdom. , the film holds a 100% approval rating on Rotten Tomatoes based on 60 reviews, with a weighted average of 9.10/10. The site's consensus reads: "Sidney Lumet's feature debut is a superbly written, dramatically effective courtroom thriller that rightfully stands as a modern classic".

American Film Institute lists:
 AFI's 100 Years...100 Movies – Nominated
 AFI's 100 Years...100 Thrills – No. 88
 AFI's 100 Years...100 Heroes & Villains: Juror No. 8 – No. 28 Hero
 AFI's 100 Years...100 Cheers – No. 42
 AFI's 100 Years...100 Movies (10th Anniversary Edition) – No. 87
 AFI's 10 Top 10 – No. 2 Courtroom Drama

Awards 
The film was selected as the second-best courtroom drama ever by the American Film Institute during their AFI's 10 Top 10 list, just after To Kill a Mockingbird, and is the highest rated courtroom drama on Rotten Tomatoes' Top 100 Movies of All Time.

Legal analyses 
Speaking at a screening of the film during the 2010 Fordham University Law School Film festival, Supreme Court Justice Sonia Sotomayor stated that seeing 12 Angry Men while she was in college influenced her decision to pursue a career in law. She was particularly inspired by immigrant Juror 11's monologue on his reverence for the American justice system. She also told the audience of law students that, as a lower-court judge, she would sometimes instruct juries to not follow the film's example, because most of the jurors' conclusions are based on speculation, not fact. Sotomayor noted that events such as Juror 8 entering a similar knife into the proceeding; performing outside research into the case matter in the first place; and ultimately the jury as a whole making broad, wide-ranging assumptions far beyond the scope of reasonable doubt (such as the inferences regarding the woman wearing glasses) would not be allowed in a real-life jury situation, and would in fact have yielded a mistrial (assuming, of course, that applicable law permitted the content of jury deliberations to be revealed).

In 2007, Michael Asimow argued that the jury in 12 Angry Men reached an incorrect verdict, writing that the amount of circumstantial evidence against the defendant should have been enough to convict him, even if the testimony of the two eyewitnesses were disregarded.

In 2012, Mike D'Angelo of The A.V. Club also questioned the verdict of the jury in the film, writing: "What ensures The Kid's guilt for practical purposes, [...] is the sheer improbability that all the evidence is erroneous. You'd have to be the jurisprudential inverse of a national lottery winner to face so many apparently damning coincidences and misidentifications. Or you'd have to be framed, which is what Johnnie Cochran was ultimately forced to argue—not just because of the DNA evidence, but because there's no other plausible explanation for why every single detail points to O.J. Simpson's guilt. But there's no reason offered in 12 Angry Men for why, say, the police would be planting switchblades."

Adaptations and parodies 
There have been a number of adaptations. 

A 1963 German TV production  was directed by Günter Gräwert, and a 1973 Spanish production, was made for TV 22 years before Spain allowed juror trials, while a 1991 homage by Kōki Mitani, Juninin no Yasashii Nihonjin ("12 gentle Japanese"), posits a Japan with a jury system and features a group of Japanese people grappling with their responsibility in the face of Japanese cultural norms. 

A 1978 episode of "Happy Days entitled "Fonzie for the Defense" puts Howard and Fonzie in a situation similar to 12 Angry men when Howard Cunningham and Fonzie find themselves the only members of the jury who are not ready to convict the defendant just because he rides a motorcycle.

A 1986 episode of Murder, She Wrote entitled "Trial by Error" pays tribute to 12 Angry Men. The major twists are originally 10 jurors vote for "not guilty" due to self defense, Jessica votes "unsure" and another juror votes "guilty". Jessica and other jurors recall the evidence, as more and more jurors switch from "not guilty due to self defense" and come to a realization as to what actually occurred the night of the murder. 

The 1987 Indian film in Hindi language Ek Ruka Hua Faisla ("a pending decision") and also in Kannada as Dashamukha ("ten faces") are the remakes of the film, with an almost identical storyline. 

Russian director Nikita Mikhalkov also made a 2007 adaptation, 12, featuring a Chechen teen on trial in Moscow. 

A 2015 Chinese adaptation, 12 Citizens, follows the plot of the original 1957 American movie, while including characters reflecting contemporary Beijing society, including a cab driver, guard, businessman, policeman, a retiree persecuted in a 1950s political movement, and others. 

The detective drama television show Veronica Mars, which like the film includes the theme of class issues, featured an episode, "One Angry Veronica", in which the title character is selected for jury duty. The episode flips the film's format and depicts one holdout convincing the jury to convict the privileged defendants of assault against a less well-off victim, despite their lawyers initially convincing 11 jury members of a not guilty verdict.

In 1997, a television remake of the film under the same title was directed by William Friedkin and produced by Metro-Goldwyn-Mayer. In the newer version, the judge is a woman and four of the jurors are black, but the overall plot remains intact. Modernizations include not smoking in the jury room, changes in references to pop culture figures and income, references to execution by lethal injection as opposed to the electric chair, more race-related dialogue and profanity.

The film has also been subject to parody. In 2015, the Comedy Central TV series Inside Amy Schumer aired a half-hour parody of the film titled "12 Angry Men Inside Amy Schumer". The BBC Television comedy Hancock's Half Hour, starring Tony Hancock and Sid James, and written by Ray Galton and Alan Simpson, was parodied in the episode broadcast on October 16, 1959. Family Guy paid tribute to the film with its Season 11 episode titled "12 and a Half Angry Men", and King of the Hill acknowledged the film with their parody "Nine Pretty Darn Angry Men" in season 3.

See also 
 Twelve Angry Men
 List of American films of 1957
 List of films considered the best

Notes

References

Further reading 
 Lumet, Sidney (1995). Making Movies. 
  In depth analysis compared with research on actual jury behaviour.
 The New York Times, April 15, 1957, Screen: '12 Angry Men'; Jury Room Drama Has Debut at Capitol review by A. H. Weiler

 Chandler, David (2005). "The Transmission model of communication" Communication as Perspective Theory. Sage publications. Ohio University
 Lanham, Richard (2003). Introduction: The Domain of Style analyzing prose. New York: Continuum

External links 

 
 
 
 

Twelve Angry Men (1957 film)
1957 directorial debut films
1957 drama films
1957 films
1950s English-language films
1950s legal films
American legal drama films
American black-and-white films
American courtroom films
Articles containing video clips
Edgar Award-winning works
Films about capital punishment
Films about discrimination
Films about lawyers
Films about murder
Films based on television plays
Films directed by Sidney Lumet
Films scored by Kenyon Hopkins
Films set in Manhattan
Films with screenplays by Reginald Rose
Golden Bear winners
Juries in fiction
United Artists films
United States National Film Registry films
1950s American films